The Drive in Arena, officially named Shlomo Group Arena due to commercial sponsorship, is a multi-purpose hall in the northern part of Tel Aviv. Built on the grounds of what was once Israel's only Drive-in theater and opened in November 2014, it is used primarily as the home arena for the basketball team Hapoel Tel Aviv.

Features
The hall has 3,504 seats, 300 of which are collapsible to allow the facility to host volleyball and handball games.

The hall also accommodates concerts and conferences. It features red and white chairs and blue plaid pattern. Besides the hall of the building, there are four dressing rooms, a gym, a dressing room for officials, press rooms, a VIP lounge and an entryway with glass fronts.

Background
In July 2007, Ron Huldai, the mayor of Tel Aviv decided to demolish Ussishkin Arena, the arena of Hapoel Tel Aviv basketball team. Despite fans' protest and struggle to save it, it was eventually demolished.

Hapoel fell apart, and was re-established by its fans and was in the lowest league, playing in the replacement arena. When Hapoel returned to the first league, the mayor decided to build a new arena, so that Hapoel would not have to travel every year.
Excitement increased among fans, and on January 4, 2015, Hapoel played for the first time in its new arena against Hapoel Jerusalem and won 81-67.

Gallery

See also
 List of indoor arenas in Israel
 Basketball in Israel

References

External links

 Drive in Arena the official website

Basketball venues in Israel
Indoor arenas in Israel
Sports venues in Tel Aviv District